Wesley Vinicius França Lima (born on 6 September 2003), commonly known as just Wesley or Wesley França, is a Brazilian professional footballer who plays as a right back. He currently plays for Flamengo.

Club career
Wesley made his debut on the 9 December 2021, starting for Flamengo in the Série A 2–0 defeat against Atlético Goianiense.

Career statistics

References

External links

2003 births
Living people
Brazilian footballers
Association football defenders
Campeonato Brasileiro Série A players
CR Flamengo footballers